The Higher Education Colleges Association (HECA) is a representative body of independent third level colleges in Ireland. It was formed in 1991, and its stated mission is to "promote the enhancement of teaching and learning within HECA colleges, such that it has tangible effects in the classroom, effectively enabling people to learn".

Lobbying
The association acts as a lobby and support group to serve common academic and commercial interests. HECA lobbies its members interests in government and legislative circles and seeks representation on government committees and boards. HECA also represents the independent education sector on a number of national and international educational bodies, such as Quality and Qualifications Ireland (QQI), the Bologna Process, International Education Board of Ireland, and the Irish Higher Education Quality Network.

References

External links
 Official website - HECA

Educational organisations based in Ireland